Improv may refer to:

Improvisation, an act of spontaneous invention
Improvisational theatre (includes improvisational comedy)
Musical improvisation
The Improv, a chain of U.S. comedy clubs
The Improv (India), a comedy show in Bangalore
Lotus Improv, a spreadsheet program

See also
Improvisations (disambiguation)